The team of the Olympic Federation of Ireland, which competed at the 2020 Summer Olympics in Tokyo, represented athletes from both the Republic of Ireland and those from Northern Ireland who choose it instead of the Great Britain and Northern Ireland team. Originally scheduled to take place from 24 July to 9 August 2020, the Games were postponed to 23 July to 8 August 2021, due to the COVID-19 pandemic. It was the team's twenty-second appearance at the Summer Olympics, having attended every edition since 1924 (before then the whole of Ireland was represented by the Great Britain and Ireland team) except the 1936 Summer Olympics in Germany.

Medalists

Competitors
The following is the list of number of competitors in the Games. Note that reserves in field hockey are not counted:

Athletics

Irish athletes further achieved the entry standards, either by qualifying time or by world ranking, in the following track and field events (up to a maximum of 3 athletes in each event).

Track & road events
Men

Women

Mixed

Badminton

Ireland entered one badminton player into the Olympic tournament. Vietnamese-born Nhat Nguyen was selected to compete in the men's singles based on the BWF World Race to Tokyo Rankings.

Boxing

Ireland entered seven boxers (four men and three women) to compete in the following weight classes into the Olympic tournament. Six of them, including Rio 2016 Olympian Brendan Irvine (men's flyweight), secured the spots on the Irish squad in their respective weight divisions, either by winning the round of 16 match, advancing to the semifinal match, or scoring a box-off triumph, at the 2020 European Qualification Tournament in London and Paris. Kurt Walker completed the nation's boxing lineup by topping the list of eligible boxers from Europe in the men's featherweight division of the IOC's Boxing Task Force Rankings.

Men

Women

Canoeing

Slalom
Ireland qualified one canoeist for the men's C-1 class by finishing in the top eleven at the 2019 ICF Canoe Slalom World Championships in La Seu d'Urgell, Spain.

Cycling

Road
Ireland entered three riders to compete in the men's Olympic road race, by virtue of their top 50 national finish (for men) in the UCI World Ranking.

Track
Following the completion of the 2020 UCI Track Cycling World Championships, Irish riders accumulated spots for both men and women in the omnium and madison, based on their country's results in the final UCI Olympic rankings.

Omnium

Madison

Diving

Ireland entered two divers into the Olympic competition after finishing in the top 12 each of the men's springboard and women's platform, respectively, at the 2021 FINA Diving World Cup in Tokyo, Japan.

Equestrian

Irish equestrians qualified a full squad in both the team dressage and eventing competitions; the former by securing the second of three available berths for Group A and B at the European Championships in Rotterdam, Netherlands, and the latter by finishing among the top six nations at the 2018 FEI World Equestrian Games in Tryon, North Carolina, United States. A team of jumping riders was added to the Irish equestrian squad by winning the gold medal at the FEI Nations Cup Final in Barcelona, Spain. Tokyo 2020 would have been the first time that Ireland participated in an Olympic team dressage competition.

The Irish eventing and jumping squads were named on 21 June 2021. The dressage squad was withdrawn following a series of individual withdrawals due to a horse retirement, veterinary and medical reasons. An individual dressage place had been sought and was eventually offered in favor of Heike Holstein. James Connor and Dane Rawlins have appealed the decision to withdraw the dressage team.

Dressage

Qualification Legend: Q = Qualified for the final; q = Qualified for the final as a lucky loser

Eventing
Austin O'Connor and Colorado Blue had been named as reserves, but replaced Cathal Daniels and Rioghan Rua shortly before the competition commenced.

Jumping
Shane Sweetnam and Alejandro were named the travelling alternates and replaced Cian O'Connor and Kilkenny before the team event.

Field hockey

Summary

Women's tournament

Ireland women's national field hockey team qualified for the Olympics by securing one of the seven team berths available from the 2019 Women's FIH Olympic Qualifiers, defeating Canada 4–3 in a penalty shoot-out, having drawn 0–0 on aggregate over a two-match playoff in Dublin. This will be the first time Ireland compete in women's field hockey at the Olympics.

Team roster

Group play

Golf

Ireland entered two male and two female golfers into the Olympic tournament. Rory McIlroy (world no. 10) and Shane Lowry (world no. 42) qualified directly among the top 60 eligible players for the men's event based on the IGF World Rankings of 20 June 2021.

Gymnastics

Artistic
Ireland entered one male and one female artistic gymnast into the Olympic competition. Rhys McClenaghan secured one of the two spots available for individual based gymnasts, neither part of the team nor qualified through the all-around, at the 2019 World Championships in Stuttgart, Germany. Megan Ryan received a re-allocated spot from the 2019 World Championships after North Korea withdrew from the Olympic Games.

Men

Women

Judo

Ireland entered two judoka (one man and one woman) into the Olympic tournament based on the International Judo Federation Olympics Individual Ranking.

Modern pentathlon

Two-time Olympian Natalya Coyle secured her selection in the women's event with an eighth-place finish and fourth among those eligible for Olympic qualification at the 2019 European Championships in Bath, England.

Rowing

Ireland qualified five boats into the Olympic regatta, with the majority of crews confirming Olympic places for their boats at the 2019 FISA World Championships in Ottensheim, Austria and at the 2021 FISA Final Qualification Regatta in Lucerne, Switzerland.

A place in the women's lightweight double sculls boat was awarded to the Irish rowing team after their third-place finish at the FISA Final Qualification Regatta, having received a vacant place from the 2021 Pan American Qualification Regatta in Rio de Janeiro, Brazil.

The crew in the women's four, Aifric Keogh, Eimear Lambe, Fiona Murtagh and Emily Hegarty, won a bronze medal, Ireland's first medal of the 2020 Games and the nation's second ever rowing medal. In the men's lightweight double sculls, Paul O'Donovan and Fintan McCarthy won Ireland's first ever Olympic gold medal in rowing, which was also the nations's first Olympic gold by male athletes since boxer Michael Carruth in 1992.

Men

Women

Qualification Legend: FA=Final A (medal); FB=Final B (non-medal); FC=Final C (non-medal); FD=Final D (non-medal); FE=Final E (non-medal); FF=Final F (non-medal); SA/B=Semifinals A/B; SC/D=Semifinals C/D; SE/F=Semifinals E/F; QF=Quarterfinals; R=Repechage

Rugby sevens

Summary

Men's tournament

Ireland national rugby sevens team qualified for the first time at the Olympics by winning the gold medal at the 2020 Final Olympic Qualification Tournament in Monaco, defeating the favorites France in the final 28–19.

Team roster

Group play

Sailing

Irish sailors qualified one boat in each of the following classes through the class-associated World Championships, and the continental regattas.

On 11 June 2020, the Irish Sailing Association decided to forgo the domestic selection trials for the women's Laser Radial class because of the worldwide pandemic. Instead, Rio 2016 silver medalist Annalise Murphy was officially nominated to the Irish roster for her third straight Games, after finishing twelfth, as the country's top-ranked sailor, at the class-associated Worlds in Melbourne, Australia four months earlier.

M = Medal race; EL = Eliminated – did not advance into the medal race; DSQ = Disqualified; 20 = worst race result is discarded

Shooting

Ireland granted an invitation from ISSF to send four-time Olympian Derek Burnett in the men's trap to the Olympics, as long as the minimum qualifying score (MQS) was fulfilled by 6 June 2021.

Swimming 

Irish swimmers further achieved qualifying standards in the following events, up to a maximum of 2 swimmers in each event at the Olympic Qualifying Time (OQT), and potentially 1 at the Olympic Selection Time (OST):

Men

Women

Taekwondo

Ireland enter one athlete into the taekwondo competition for the first time at the Games. With the Grand Slam winner already qualified through the WT Olympic Rankings, the automatic spot associated with the winner defaulted to the Olympic rankings list, from which the first five taekwondo practitioners had already won quota places. As the next highest-ranked eligible taekwondo practitioner, 2019 European silver medalist Jack Woolley thereby secured Ireland's first ever Olympic quota place, in the men's flyweight category (58 kg).

Triathlon

Individual

See also
Ireland at the 2020 Summer Paralympics

References

Nations at the 2020 Summer Olympics
2020
2021 in Irish sport